Agelasta cristata is a species of beetle in the family Cerambycidae. It was described by Stephan von Breuning in 1938. It is often found in/endemic to Myanmar.

References

cristata
Beetles described in 1938